Justin Bernard Salas (born March 13, 1982) is an American mixed martial artist who competes as a lightweight. He was signed with the Ultimate Fighting Championship from 2012 to 2016.

Background
Salas is from Green River, Wyoming, and had a very successful career in wrestling. Salas was a two-time State Champion in high school, as well as a two-time high school All-American, in addition to winning the Dave Schultz High School Hall of Fame Award. Salas then went on to wrestle for the University of Wyoming's NCAA Division I program from 2000 to 2003, but dropped out of college to pursue a career in mixed martial arts.

Mixed martial arts career

Ultimate Fighting Championship
On January 16, 2012, it was announced that Salas has signed a multi-fight deal with the UFC. He made his promotional debut on February 15 against fellow newcomer Anton Kuivanen in UFC on Fuel TV 1. He won via unanimous decision.

Salas faced Tim Means on June 8, 2012, at UFC on FX 3. Means defeated Salas via first round TKO.

Salas was expected to face Edson Barboza on January 19, 2013, at UFC on FX 7.  However, Salas was forced out of the bout with an injury and replaced by promotional newcomer Lucas Martins.

Salas faced Aaron Riley on July 27, 2013, at UFC on Fox 8. He won the back-and-forth fight by split decision.

Salas faced Thiago Tavares on November 9, 2013, at UFC Fight Night 32, replacing an injured Quinn Mulhern. He lost the fight via submission in the first round.

Salas faced Ben Wall on May 10, 2014, at UFC Fight Night 40. He won the fight via knockout in the first round.

Salas faced Joe Proctor on July 16, 2014, at UFC Fight Night 45.  Salas lost the bout via second round TKO.

Salas faced Jason Saggo on March 5, 2016, at UFC 196. He lost the fight via TKO in the first round and was subsequently released from the promotion.

Championships and accomplishments
Full Force Fighting
FFF Lightweight Championship (One time)

Mixed martial arts record

|-
|Loss
|align=center|12–7
|Jason Saggo
|TKO (punches)
|UFC 196
|
|align=center|1
|align=center|4:31
|Las Vegas, Nevada, United States
|
|-
|Loss
|align=center|12–6
| Joe Proctor
| TKO (punches)
| UFC Fight Night: Cowboy vs. Miller
| 
|align=center| 2
|align=center| 3:27
|Atlantic City, New Jersey, United States
|
|-
|Win
|align=center|12–5
| Ben Wall
| KO (punches)
| UFC Fight Night: Brown vs. Silva
| 
|align=center| 1
|align=center| 2:21
|Cincinnati, Ohio, United States
|
|-
|Loss
|align=center|11–5
|Thiago Tavares
|Submission (rear-naked choke)
|UFC Fight Night: Belfort vs. Henderson 2
|
|align=center|1
|align=center|2:38
|Goiânia, Brazil
|
|-
|Win
|align=center|11–4
|Aaron Riley
|Decision (split)
|UFC on Fox: Johnson vs. Moraga	
|
|align=center|3
|align=center|5:00
|Seattle, Washington, United States
|
|-
|Loss
|align=center|10–4
|Tim Means
|TKO (knee and punches)
|UFC on FX: Johnson vs. McCall 2	
|
|align=center|1
|align=center|1:06
|Sunrise, Florida, United States
|
|-
|Win
|align=center|10–3
|Anton Kuivanen
|Decision (unanimous)
|UFC on Fuel TV: Sanchez vs. Ellenberger	
|
|align=center|3
|align=center|5:00
|Omaha, Nebraska, United States
|
|-
|Win
|align=center|9–3
|Joe Ellenberger
|Decision (unanimous)
|Victory Fighting Championship 36
|
|align=center|5
|align=center|5:00
|Council Bluffs, Iowa, United States
|
|-
|Win
|align=center|8–3
|Rob Emerson
|Decision (unanimous)
|Full Force Fighting - Vol. 1
|
|align=center|3
|align=center|5:00
|Denver, Colorado, United States
|
|-
|Win
|align=center|7–3
|Matt Simms
|TKO (punches)
|Fight To Win/King of Champions: Worlds Collide
|
|align=center|2
|align=center|2:14
|Denver, Colorado, United States
|
|-
|Win
|align=center|6–3
|Robert Simmons
|TKO (punches)
|Fight To Win: Phenoms
|
|align=center|1
|align=center|1:40
|Denver, Colorado, United States
|
|-
|Win
|align=center|5–3
|Josh Arocho
|Submission (rear-naked choke)
|Midwest Championship Fighting: Resurrection
|
|align=center|1
|align=center|3:53
|North Platte, Nebraska, United States
|
|-
|Loss
|align=center|4–3
|Eddie Pelczynski
|TKO (punches)
|Ring of Fire 35: Summer Brawl
|
|align=center|1
|align=center|0:09
|Broomfield, Colorado, United States
|
|-
|Loss
|align=center|4–2
|Andrew Chappelle
|Submission (triangle choke)
|Ring of Fire 33: Adrenaline
|
|align=center|1
|align=center|2:06
|Broomfield, Colorado, United States
|
|-
|Win
|align=center|4–1
|Eric Fagyas
|Submission (guillotine choke)
|Warriors Collide 4
|
|align=center|1
|align=center|1:09
|Cripple Creek, Colorado, United States
|
|-
|Win
|align=center|3–1
|Max Smith
|Submission (rear-naked choke)
|Ring of Fire 32: Respect
|
|align=center|1
|align=center|1:26
|Broomfield, Colorado, United States
|
|-
|Win
|align=center|2–1
|Kris Hartman
|Decision (majority)
|Ring of Fire 27: Collision Course
|
|align=center|2
|align=center|5:00
|Castle Rock, Colorado, United States
|
|-
|Win
|align=center|1–1
|Corey Lieberth
|KO (punches)
|Midwest Championship Fighting: Genesis
|
|align=center|1
|align=center|1:33
|North Platte, Nebraska, United States
|
|-
|Loss
|align=center|0–1
|Corey Lieberth
|Submission (armbar)
|Victory Fighting Championship 13: Redemption
|
|align=center|3
|align=center|N/A
|North Platte, Nebraska, United States
|

See also
 List of male mixed martial artists

References

External links
Official UFC Profile

American male mixed martial artists
Lightweight mixed martial artists
Mixed martial artists utilizing collegiate wrestling
Mixed martial artists utilizing Brazilian jiu-jitsu
Living people
Mixed martial artists from Wyoming
People from Green River, Wyoming
1982 births
Ultimate Fighting Championship male fighters
American practitioners of Brazilian jiu-jitsu